Dot-voting (also known as dotmocracy or voting with dots) is an established facilitation method used to describe voting with dot stickers or marks with a marker pen.

In dot-voting participants vote on their chosen options using  a limited number of stickers or marks with pens — dot stickers being the most common. This sticker voting approach is a form of cumulative voting.

Process specifics 
The dot-voting process includes the following steps:
 Participants are each given a set number of dot stickers (as decided by the facilitator)
 They place dot stickers next to options presented that they like (they may place any number of their dots on any number of the options)
 Options with the most dots at the end of voting “win”
Variations include:
  using different colour dots to signify different values, e.g. green for "like" and red for "dislike".
 using different colour dots for different types of participants e.g. blue for management and red for staff.
vote with negative dots (resistance votes) to find the highest group acceptance. Options with the least dots at the end of voting "win".

History 
The origins of dot-voting are unclear. Professional facilitators are said to have been using it since the 1980s.

Dot-voting is now widely used for making quick collaborative decisions by teams adopting agile and lean methodologies. For example, it is one of the methods endorsed by the 18F digital services agency of the United States' General Services Administration, and is part of the Design Sprint methodology.

Benefits 
Dot-voting is a quick and simple method for prioritizing a long list of options.

It’s less cognitively demanding than having to perform full ranking of all the options, because participants are not required to give a comparative judgment of each option, and it allows participants to express a preference for more than one option at the same time.

It also creates a sense of engagement and allows participants to see the decision process in action and understand how the final choice was made.

Criticism
Dot-voting has been criticized for limiting creativity and diversity of ideas, and giving confusing or false results. Dot-voting is like a one question multiple-choice survey done with stickers.

Participants are expected to review, consider and compare all options before sticking their dots. As a result, too many options can be overwhelming (see overchoice) and thus facilitators are encouraged to amalgamate and generalize unique ideas into broader and less specific concepts.

New options cannot be added once dotting has started, as this would not be fair to the new additions.

Similar or related options are penalized, as these can cause vote-splitting.

Participants can easily cheat by adding extra dots, peeling off dots or moving dots.

Often people will simply add their dots where everyone else has dotted, without considering their own opinion on all the options, thus an example of the Bandwagon effect.

It is also impossible to tell if a result represents broad popularity (because many people gave one dot) or an enthusiastic minority (where a few people gave many dots).

Overall not all results are reliable.

References 

Group decision-making
Collaboration
Collective intelligence
Unconferences